Joe Donald Stanka (July 23, 1931 – October 15, 2018) was an American professional baseball player. The right-handed pitcher from Hammon, Oklahoma played for the Chicago White Sox of Major League Baseball (1959), and the Nankai Hawks and Taiyo Whales in the Japanese professional leagues (1960–66).

Biography
His big-league career consisted of only two appearances that year. In his first MLB game, September 2 against the Detroit Tigers, Stanka entered the game in relief of starting pitcher Barry Latman in the fifth inning at Comiskey Park with Chicago trailing 3–0. He retired the Tigers without further damage. Then, in their half of the fifth, the White Sox exploded for 11 runs, with Stanka contributing to the rally with a single in his second big-league at bat. He went on to pitch 3 innings of one-hit, one-run relief and was credited with the win in an 11–4 ChiSox triumph. Stanka pitched in only one more contest that month, a two-inning relief stint against the Cleveland Indians, September 5. The White Sox and Indians were then embroiled in a pennant race that ultimately delivered Chicago its first American League title since . Stanka did not appear in the 1959 World Series.

In two games and 5 MLB innings pitched, Stanka allowed two hits, two earned runs and four bases on balls; he struck out three. His career 1–0 win–loss record was accompanied by a 3.38 earned run average.

He signed with the Nankai Hawks (current Fukuoka SoftBank Hawks) during the 1959 off-season. He was one of the first players to be signed from the Triple-A class of the minor leagues, and the team calculated that he should be able to win over 15 games in the Japanese Pacific League.

Stanka entered the starting rotation in his first year, and marked a 17–12 record in his first year, leading the league with 103 walks. He played his best season in 1964, winning 26 games to receive the league MVP award. He pitched shutouts in Games 1, 6, and 7 of the Japan Series against the Hanshin Tigers to win the Japan Series MVP award as well.

He continued to pitch for the Hawks in 1965, but left the team after his eldest son died in a tragic accident. He played for the Taiyo Whales in 1966 before retiring. He is tied with Gene Bacque for the most wins among American players in Japan, going 100–72 during his seven-year career in Japan.

Stanka appeared as himself on the January 1, 1962 episode of the game show To Tell The Truth.

Stanka died on October 15, 2018.

See also 
 American expatriate baseball players in Japan

References

Further reading
Dennis Snelling; A Glimpse of Fame, McFarland & Company, Jefferson N.C., 1993, pp. 35–52

External links
 Career statistics

1931 births
2018 deaths
People from Hammon, Oklahoma
American expatriate baseball players in Japan
Baseball players from Oklahoma
Cedar Rapids Indians players
Chicago White Sox players
Des Moines Bruins players
Los Angeles Angels (minor league) players
Macon Peaches players
Major League Baseball pitchers
Nankai Hawks players
Nippon Professional Baseball MVP Award winners
Ponca City Dodgers players
Pueblo Dodgers players
Sacramento Solons players
Shawnee Hawks players
Taiyō Whales players
Oklahoma State Cowboys baseball players